Results from the 1989 Monaco Grand Prix Formula Three held at Monte Carlo on May 6, 1989, in the Circuit de Monaco.

Classification 

Monaco Grand Prix Formula Three
Formula Three
Motorsport in Monaco